Jana Laššáková ( Murcková; born 22 May 1952 in Plavnica) is a Slovak politician and lawyer. In 2002-2017, she was a Member of the National Council. Since December 2017 she has served as a Justice of the Constitutional Court of Slovakia.

Legal career 
Laššáková studied Law at the Comenius University, graduating in 1976. After graduation she worked as an in-house counsel for various companies as well as an attorney.

Political career 
Laššáková served as the Chairwoman of the Direction – Slovak Social Democracy in the Banská Bystrica region since its founding. In 2002 she became a MP. In 2012, she became the Leader of the Direction – Slovak Social Democracy caucus. In this position she gained notoriety for using thumb up/thumb down gestures to inform her fellow caucus members how they should vote.

In 2017 she was chosen a Justice of the Constitutional Court of Slovakia by the parliament. The confirmation of her appointment by president Andrej Kiska got delayed as the president was unconvinced by the expertise of the parliament's choices and requested clarification from the Constitutional Court of Slovakia as to whether he is allowed not to confirm the candidates. Upon courts' ruling confirming the president has to confirm parliament's nominees, Laššáková  was confirmed. Upon joining the Constitutional Court, she gave up all her political and party functions.

References

Direction – Social Democracy politicians
Slovak jurists
Living people
1952 births
Comenius University alumni
Members of the National Council (Slovakia) 2002-2006
Members of the National Council (Slovakia) 2006-2010
Members of the National Council (Slovakia) 2010-2012
21st-century Slovak women politicians
Members of the National Council (Slovakia) 2012-2016
Members of the National Council (Slovakia) 2016-2020
People from Stará Ľubovňa District
Female members of the National Council (Slovakia)
21st-century women judges